Erik Andersson (born July 4, 1994) is a Swedish professional ice hockey player. He is currently playing with Timrå IK of the Swedish Hockey League (SHL).

Andersson made his Swedish Hockey League debut playing with HV71 during the 2013–14 SHL season.

Awards and honors

References

External links

1994 births
Living people
HV71 players
Rögle BK players
Swedish ice hockey left wingers
Timrå IK players
VIK Västerås HK players